Redemption (Italian: Redenzione) is a 1952 Italian melodrama film directed by Piero Caserini and starring Luisa Rossi, Marco Vicario and Juan de Landa. The film's sets were designed by the art director Ivo Battelli.

Plot 
The young shepherdess Nicuzza is seduced and abandoned by a young count: the girl becomes pregnant with her but the count does not intend to recognize the child. Nicuzza decides to take revenge and she kills the count on the day of her marriage to another noblewoman. Nicuzza is imprisoned and gives birth to a child who immediately shows problems with her sight.

Cast
 Luisa Rossi as Nicuzza
 Marco Vicario as Barone Paolo Di San Lario
 Juan de Landa as Parroco
 Enrico Olivieri as Figlio Di Nicuzza
 Laura Tiberti
 Paolo Iacopozzi as Piero
 Peter Trent
 Giuseppe Corradi
 Clara Paoloni
 Arrigo Basevi
 Margherita Bambini

References

Bibliography 
 Chiti, Roberto & Poppi, Roberto. Dizionario del cinema italiano: Dal 1945 al 1959. Gremese Editore, 1991.

External links
 

1952 films
1950s Italian-language films
Melodrama films
Italian drama films
1952 drama films
Italian black-and-white films
1950s Italian films